Ann Kelley (born 17 December 1941) is a British writer known best for children's books. The Burying Beetle made the Branford Boase Award shortlist and The Bower Bird was Costa Children's Book of the Year. Several collections of her poetry and photographs were published before she wrote the novels that are the first two in a trilogy.

Biography 

The Burying Beetle and The Bower Bird chronicle the story of Gussie, a 12-year-old girl who suffers from pulmonary atresia, a rare heart disease. Gussie is marked by her vivacity and thirst for knowledge, living every day to the full. The character is modelled on Ann's late son, Nathan Kelley, who suffered from the same congenital heart condition. When her son was born doctors said he would not survive the week and later said he would never walk. But Nathan defied predictions and lived to become an accomplished student. He had a passion for marine life and discovered two new fish cancers at the age of 16 (both registered with the U.S. Smithsonian Institution). Nathan went on to study biology and space sciences at Reading University and University College London. He died at age 24, a week after receiving a heart and lung transplant in December 1985.

Ann began writing poetry years after Nathan's death and published The Poetry Remedy in 1999 and then Paper Whites in 2001. Ann's first novel, The Burying Beetle, was published in 2005 by Luath Press Ltd and Because We Have Reached That Place (poetry) was published by Oversteps Books in 2006.

Her work, The Bower Bird (also published by Luath) won the 2007 Costa Book Awards Children's Book of the Year.

Ann has said about her books:'Gussie just came to me. I don't write for children, I write for a reader. It's a glimpse into the head of a child with a chronic disease, who has to find a way to live her short life to the full... Gussie isn't my son. She is an amalgamation of several people – my daughter, my grand daughter, my son and me – and she is mostly herself. My son knew that even with a successful transplant, in those days he would only have had a few more years. But he was so happy to have been given that chance. I think that is why I write about Gussie – to make people see the importance of being an organ donor. Please be an Organ Donor.'Ann has won several prizes for her poetry and has run courses for aspiring poets from her home. She also conducts special study units in poetry writing for medical students and speaks about her work with patients at medical conferences. She is an honorary teaching fellow at Peninsula College of Medicine and Dentistry, University of Exeter and Plymouth. Her collected photographic works are Born and Bred (1988) and Sea Front (2005).

Ann Kelley also has a daughter, Caroline, and two grandchildren. She lives with her second husband in St Ives, Cornwall.

Works 

Novels
 The Burying Beetle, 2005 
 The Bower Bird, 2007 
 Inchworm, 2008
 Koh Tabu, 2010
 Lost Girls, 2012
 Runners, 2013
 Last Days in Eden, 2017

Poetry
 The Poetry Remedy, 1999
 Paper Whites (poetry and photography), 2001
 Because We Have Reached That Place, 2006

Photography
 Born and Bred, 1988
 Sea Front, 2005
 The Light at St. Ives, 2010

Audio Books
 Nine Lives: Cat Tales

See also

References

External links 
 

British children's writers
British poets
British women poets
Photographers from Cornwall
British women photographers
Novelists from Cornwall
Poets from Cornwall
Living people
1941 births
Place of birth missing (living people)
British women children's writers
British women novelists
21st-century British novelists
21st-century British women writers